8 Out of 10 Cats is a British comedy panel show currently airing on E4. It was first broadcast on Channel 4 on 3 June 2005. The show is hosted by Jimmy Carr and the current team captains are Rob Beckett and Katherine Ryan.

The original lineup featured host Jimmy Carr with team captains Sean Lock and Dave Spikey. Spikey was replaced by Jason Manford from the fifth series onwards, who was in turn replaced by Jon Richardson in the eleventh series. For the nineteenth series, both captains were replaced by Aisling Bea and Rob Beckett, although the previous captains remained as regulars on 8 Out of 10 Cats Does Countdown and the show moved to More4. It moved to E4 for the following series, with Beckett remaining as captain while Bea was replaced by various guest captains. From Series 22 (2020), Katherine Ryan became a permanent team captain.

Series overview

Episodes
 Legend
  – Indicates Sean's/Rob's team won.
  – Indicates the other team won.
  – Indicates the game ended in a draw.

Series 1 (2005)

Series 2 (2006)

Series 3 (2006)

Series 4 (2006)

Series 5 (2007)

Series 6 (2008)

Series 7 (2008)

Series 8 (2009)

Series 9 (2010)

Series 10 (2010)

Comic Relief special (2011)

Series 11 (2011)

Series 12 (2011)

Sport Relief special (2012)

Series 13 (2012)

Series 14 (2012)

Series 15 (2013)

Series 16 (2013)

Series 17 (2014)

Series 18 (2014)

Specials (2015)

Series 19 (2016–17)

Series 20 (2017)

Series 21 (2019–20)

Series 22 (2020–21)

See also
List of 8 Out of 10 Cats Does Countdown episodes

Notes

Episode notes

Viewer notes

References

External links
List of 

Lists of British comedy television series episodes
Lists of British non-fiction television series episodes